In the Republic of India, the various central and state legislatures are presided by either a Speaker or a Chairperson. A speaker is the presiding officer of the Lok Sabha and of the legislative assembly of each of the twenty-eight states and three union territories. Similarly a chairperson heads the Rajya Sabha and the legislative council of each of the six states, where the upper house in the state legislature exists.

Parliament of India
This is the list of current Speakers and Chairpersons of both houses of the Parliament of India (respectively):

Lok Sabha

Rajya Sabha

Legislatures of the States and Union territories

State Legislative Assemblies
This is the list of current Speakers and Deputy Speakers of the legislative assemblies of the Indian states and union territories:

State Legislative Councils
This is the list of current Chairpersons and Deputy Chairpersons of the legislative councils of the Indian states:

See also
 List of current Indian governors
 List of current Indian chief ministers
 List of current Indian chief justices
 List of current Indian opposition leaders
 List of speakers of the Lok Sabha
 List of deputy speakers of the Lok Sabha
 List of chairpersons of the Rajya Sabha
 List of deputy chairpersons of the Rajya Sabha

References

S